Dato' James Selvaraj Joseph  (born 21 November 1950) is a Malaysian former badminton player and coach.

Badminton career 
James was a former national shuttler during the mid 1970s to early 1980s. He was a national singles champion for three consecutive years from 1974 to 1976. In the 1975/76 Thomas Cup series, he was a member of the team who were runner-up to Indonesia. Among his other achievements were a bronze medal at the 1977 Sea Games in Kuala Lumpur and a bronze medal at the 1978 Commonwealth Games in Edmonton.

Post-retirement 
James was the national badminton coach from 1982 to 1985 and Badminton Association of Malaysia (BAM) High Performance Director from 2010 to 2012.

Achievement

Southeast Asian Games 
Men's singles

Honour

Honours of Malaysia 

 :
  Knight Commander of the Grand Order of Tuanku Ja’afar (D.P.T.J.) - Dato' (2005)

References 

1950 births
Living people
Malaysian male badminton players
Malaysian people of Tamil descent
Malaysian sportspeople of Indian descent
People from Selangor
Southeast Asian Games medalists in badminton
Competitors at the 1973 Southeast Asian Peninsular Games
Competitors at the 1975 Southeast Asian Peninsular Games
Competitors at the 1977 Southeast Asian Games
Competitors at the 1979 Southeast Asian Games
Southeast Asian Games silver medalists for Malaysia
Southeast Asian Games bronze medalists for Malaysia
Badminton players at the 1978 Commonwealth Games
Badminton players at the 1982 Commonwealth Games
Commonwealth Games bronze medallists for Malaysia
Commonwealth Games medallists in badminton
Malaysian sports coaches
National team coaches
Badminton coaches
Medallists at the 1978 Commonwealth Games